The 2010–11 Belgian Cup (also known as Cofidis Cup because of sponsoring purposes) is the 56th season of the main knockout football competition in Belgium. It commenced on 24 July 2010 with the first matches of Round 1 and will conclude with the Final in May 2011. K. A. A. Gent are the defending champions having won their third Belgian Cup in the 2009-10 season.

Competition modus
The competition consisted of ten rounds. The first seven rounds were held as single-match elimination rounds. When tied after 90 minutes in the first three rounds, penalties were taken immediately. In rounds four to seven, when tied after 90 minutes first an extra time period of 30 minutes was played, then penalties were taken if still necessary. The quarter- and semifinals were played in a two-leg modus, where the team winning on aggregate advanced. The Final was then again played as a single match.

Teams entered the competition in different rounds, based upon their 2009–10 league affiliation. Teams from the fourth-level Promotion or lower began in Round 1. Third Division teams entered in Round 3, with Second Division teams joining in the following round. Teams from the Belgian First Division entered in Round 6.

Starting Rounds
The starting five rounds featured only teams of lower divisions and all matches were played during the summer and early fall, mostly in July and August.

Round 1
The matches were played on 23 through 27 July 2010.

Round 2
The matches were played on 31 July and 1 August 2010.

Round 3
The matches were played on 7 and 8 August 2010.

Round 4
The matches were played during the weekend of 14 and 15 August 2010.

|}

Note
Note 1: Order of legs reversed after original draw.

Round 5
The matches were played on 22 August 2010.

|}

Final Stages

Bracket

Round 6
These matches took place on 26–27 October 2010.

Round 7
These matches took place in November 2010.

Quarterfinals
The draw for the quarter- and semifinals took place on November 24, 2010. The matches will be played over two legs.

First legs

Second legs

Gent wins 3–0 on aggregate.

Cercle Brugge wins 3–1 on aggregate.

Standard wins 6–1 on aggregate.

4–4 on aggregate, Westerlo won on away goals.

Semifinals
The semi finals will also be two-legged.

First legs

Second legs

3–3 on aggregate, Westerlo won on away goals.

Standard wins 4–3 on aggregate.

Final

See also
 2010–11 Belgian First Division

References

External links
 Official site 

2010-11
2010–11 domestic association football cups
Cup